Elizabeth Ferrars (6 September 1907 – 30 March 1995), born Morna Doris MacTaggart, was a British crime writer.

Life and work
She was born in Rangoon (currently Yangon), Burma into a Scottish timber and rice-trading family. Her early years were in the hands of a German nanny, and the initial intention was that she should be sent to Berlin to complete her education. The deteriorating political climate between Britain and Germany led to her moving to Britain instead at the age of six. She attended Bedales School from 1918 to 1924. She claimed in later years that she never would have been able to write crime novels if she had not learned German as a child from her nanny, the rigorous sentence structure and complex rules of grammar being an indispensable preparation for the architecture of a crime thriller.  Unable to study English Literature, because she was never taught Latin or Greek, she took a diploma in journalism at London University (1925–1928), and wrote two novels under her own name in the early 1930s. It was at this time that she met and married her first husband.

Around 1940, she met a lecturer in Botany at Bedford College, Dr (later Professor) Robert Brown, and the same year her first crime novel, Give a Corpse a Bad Name, was published. She separated from her first husband and lived with Robert Brown in Belsize Park, London, from 1942. However, she did not obtain a divorce and marry Brown until October 1945. She remained on friendly terms with her first husband, who also remarried. In 1951 she and her new husband moved to Cornell University in the USA, where her husband had been offered a post. Notwithstanding the financial attraction of such a posting in austerity postwar Britain, they returned a year later owing to the atmosphere of McCarthyism. Having seen the rise of fascism in Europe, they were disturbed by the "witch-hunts" against many writers and academics accused of communist sympathies. In 1953, she became one of the founding members of the Crime Writers' Association (she was its chair in 1977). She was inducted into the famed Detection Club in 1958.

From 1957, when her husband was appointed Regius Professor of Botany at the University of Edinburgh, until shortly after his retirement in 1977, they lived in Edinburgh. Citing the long, cold winters as a reason, they then moved south to the village of Blewbury in Oxfordshire, where they lived until her sudden death in 1995. She professed no religious faith and was probably instrumental in turning her husband from distinct evangelism in the 1930s towards agnosticism. She was buried in Blewbury in a non-religious ceremony. Her final novel, A Thief in the Night, was published posthumously in 1995. She was survived by a nephew, Peter MacTaggart. In the United States, her novels were published under the name E.X. Ferrars, her US publishers assuring her that "the 'X' would 'do it'". Ferrars was in fact her mother's maiden name.

Though the majority of Ferrars's works are standalone novels, she wrote several series.  Her first five novels all feature Toby Dyke, a freelance journalist, and his companion, George, who uses several surnames and is implied to be a former criminal. Late in her career, she began writing about a semi-estranged married couple, Virginia and Felix Freer, and a retired botanist, Andrew Basnett. Several of her short stories also feature an elderly detective called Jonas P. Jonas.

Her extraordinary output owes a great deal to considerable self-discipline and diligent method.  Her plots were worked out in detail in hand-written notebooks before being filled out in typed manuscript; she said that they were worked backwards from the denouement. Like every writer, she based characters and situations on people she knew and things she had seen in real life.  She travelled with her husband when his academic career required, for example to Adelaide where he was a visiting professor at the University of South Australia, and on holidays specially to Madeira, which they loved.

Her books are written so that readers are spared from violence or extreme unpleasantness. Due to their backgrounds, her characters do not expect crime or violence to impinge on their lives. They are educated, and often work in academic or artistic fields. Female characters are independent and "politely feminist."

Bibliography
Novels written as Morna MacTaggart
Turn Single (1932)
Broken Music (1934)

Toby Dyke series
Give a Corpse a Bad Name (1940)
Remove the Bodies (1941) (published in the US as Rehearsals for Murder)
Death in Botanist's Bay (1941) (published in the US as Murder of a Suicide)
Don't Monkey with Murder (1942) (published in the US as The Shape of a Stain)
Your Neck in a Noose (1942) (published in the US as Neck in a Noose)

Virginia and Felix Freer series
Last Will and Testament (1978)
Frog in the Throat (1980)
Thinner Than Water (1981)
Death of a Minor Character (1983)
I Met Murder (1985)
Woman Slaughter (1989)
Sleep of the Unjust (1990)
Beware of the Dog (1992)

Andrew Basnett series
Something Wicked (1983)
The Root of All Evil (1984)
The Crime and the Crystal (1985)
The Other Devil's Name (1986)
A Murder Too Many (1988)
Smoke Without Fire (1990)
A Hobby of Murder (1994)
A Choice of Evils (1995)

Other novels
I, Said The Fly (1945)
Murder among Friends (1946) (published in the US as Cheat the Hangman)
With Murder in Mind (1948)
The March Hare Murders (1949)
Milk of Human Kindness (1950)
Hunt the Tortoise (1950)
The Clock that Wouldn't Stop (1952)
Alibi for a Witch (1952)
Murder in Time (1953)
The Lying Voices (1954)
Enough to Kill a Horse (1955)
Always Say Die (1956) (published in the US as We Haven't Seen Her Lately; see Media Adaptations)
Murder Moves In (1956) (published in the US as Kill or Cure)
Furnished for Murder (1957)
Unreasonable Doubt (1958) (published in the US as Count the Cost)
A Tale of Two Murders (1959) (published in the US as Depart This Life)
Fear the Light (1960)
Sleeping Dogs (1960)
The Wandering Widows (1962)
The Busy Body (1962) (published in the US as Seeing Double)
The Doubly Dead (1963)
A Legal Fiction (1964) (published in the US as The Decayed Gentlewoman)
Ninth Life (1965)
No Peace for the Wicked (1965)
Zero at the Bone (1967)
The Swaying Pillars (1968)
Skeleton Staff (1969)
The Seven Sleepers (1970)
A Stranger and Afraid (1971)
Breath of Suspicion (1972)
The Small World of Murder (1973)
Foot in the Grave (1973)
Hanged Man's House (1974)
Alive and Dead (1974)
Drowned Rat (1975)
The Cup and the Lip (1975)
Blood Flies Upwards (1976)
Pretty Pink Shroud (1977)
Murders Anonymous (1977)
In at the Kill (1978)
Witness Before the Fact (1979)
Experiment with Death (1981)
Skeleton in Search of a Cupboard (1982) (published in the US as Skeleton in Search of a Closet)
Come and Be Killed (1987)
Trial by Fury (1989)
Danger from the Dead (1991)
Answer Came There None (1992)
Thy Brother Death (1993)
Seeing Is Believing (1994)
A Thief in the Night (1995)

Short story compilations
Designs on Life (1980)
Sequence of Events (1989)
The Casebook of Jonas P. Jonas and Other Mysteries (Crippen & Landru, 2012)

Articles
"No Danger to Detectives!" [Reply to sci-fi author John Wyndham's "Roar of the Rockets." John O'London's Weekly 9 April 1954

Other

 Introduction, Planned Departures: A Crime Writers Association Anthology (Hodder & Stoughton, 1958)

Media adaptations
"We Haven't Seen Her Lately," adapted from the novel by E. X. Ferrars and starring George C. Scott, Kraft Television Theatre (Aug. 1958)

References

External links
"Elizabeth Ferrars", Fantastic fiction
"Elizabeth X Ferrars", Books and Writers

British crime writers
1907 births
1995 deaths
Members of the Detection Club
20th-century British women writers
Women crime writers
People from Yangon
Writers from Edinburgh
People from Blewbury
British people in British Burma